Mesopotam (- Mesopotamos) is a village and a former commune in Vlorë County, southern Albania. At the 2015 local government reform it became a subdivision of the municipality Finiq. The population at the 2011 census was 2,786,

Besides the village Mesopotam from which it takes its name and which functions as well as an administrative center, the administrative unit consists of 14 other villages: Ardhasovë, Bistricë, Brajlat, Dhrovjan, Fitore, Kardhikaq, Kostar, Kranë, Krongj, Livinë, Muzinë, Pecë, Sirakat, and Velahovë.

Etymology
The name comes from Greek, meaning "between rivers".

Population
The People's Republic of Albania (1945-1991) established cultural rights in special minority zones for ethnic Greeks in all 14 villages of Mesopotam. These rights were preserved after the fall of socialism in Albania. According to a fieldwork of 1995 the majority of the villages, including Mesopotam itself, are inhabited solely by the Greek community, while Muzinë and Pecë, by the Albanian Orthodox. Bistricë has a mixed population and Kardhikaq is a mixed village inhabited by Greeks and Aromanians.

Attractions
The Mesopotam village is known for its 13th century Orthodox Church dedicated to St. Nicholas, declared "Protected Monument" from the government.

The "Blue Eye"  water spring nearby is a well-known touristic destination.

Notable people
Constantine Mesopotamites, Byzantine official.

See also
Tourism in Albania
Bistricë river
Phoenice
List of Religious Cultural Monuments of Albania

References

Administrative units of Finiq
Former municipalities in Vlorë County
Greek communities in Albania
Villages in Vlorë County